Polycesta arizonica is a species of metallic wood-boring beetle in the family Buprestidae. It is found in North America.

Subspecies
These two subspecies belong to the species Polycesta arizonica:
 Polycesta arizonica acidota Cazier, 1951
 Polycesta arizonica arizonica Schaeffer, 1906

References

Further reading

 
 
 

Buprestidae
Articles created by Qbugbot
Beetles described in 1906